Atractus alphonsehogei, also known commonly as Alphonse's ground snake, is a species of snake in the family Colubridae. The species is endemic to Brazil.

Etymology
The specific name, alphonsehogei, is in honor of Brazilian-born Belgian herpetologist Alphonse Richard Hoge.

Geographic range
A. alphonsehogei is found in northern Brazil, in the Brazilian states of Amazonas, Maranhão, Pará, and Roraima.

Habitat
The preferred natural habitat of A. alphonsehogei is forest.

Description
Dorsally, it is brown to grayish black, with a cream-colored incomplete occipital collar. Ventrally, it is cream-colored, with a dark line running down each side of the belly, near the ends of the ventrals. Each smooth dorsal scale has one, or rarely two, apical pits. The dorsal scales are arranged in 17 rows throughout the whole length of the body (17/17/17). Mature males have tubercles in the cloacal region.

Behavior
A. alphonsehogei is terrestrial and fossorial.

Diet
A. alphonsehogei preys predominately upon earthworms.

Reproduction
A. alphonsehogei is oviparous.

References

Further reading
Cunha OR, Nascimento FP (1983). "Ofidios da Amazonia 20 – As especies de Atractus Wagler, 1828, na Amazonia oriental & Maranhão (Ophidia, Colubridae)". Boletim do Museu Paraense Emilio Goeldi, Nova Serie, Zoologia (123): 1–38. (Atractus alphonsehogei, new species). (in Portuguese).
Martins M, Oliveira ME (1993). "The snakes of the genus Atractus Wagler (Reptilia: Squamata: Colubridae) from the Manaus region, central Amazonia, Brazil". Zoologische Mededelingen 67: 21–40.
Passos P, Prudente ALC, Ramos LO, Caicedo-Portilla JR, Lynch JD (2018). "Species delimitations in the Atractus collaris complex (Serpentes: Dipsadidae)". Zootaxa 4392 (3): 491–520.

Atractus
Reptiles of Brazil
Endemic fauna of Brazil
Snakes of South America
Reptiles described in 1983